Stylasteridae is a family of hydrozoans.

Genera
According to the World Register of Marine Species, the following genera belong to this family:
Adelopora Cairns, 1982
Astya Stechow, 1921d
Axoporella †
Calyptopora Boschma, 1968
Cheiloporidion Cairns, 1983
Congregopora Nielsen, 1919 †
Conopora Moseley, 1879
Crypthelia Milne Edwards & Haime, 1849
Cyclohelia Cairns, 1991
Distichopora Lamarck, 1816
Errina Gray, 1835
Errinopora Fisher, 1938
Errinopsis Broch, 1951
Gyropora Boschma, 1960
Inferiolabiata Broch, 1951
Lepidopora Pourtalès, 1871
Lepidotheca Cairns, 1983
Leptohelia Lindner, Cairns & Zibrowius, 2014
Paraerrina Broch, 1942
Phalangopora Kirkpatrick, 1887
Pliobothrus Pourtalès, 1868
Pseudocrypthelia Cairns, 1983
Sporadopora Moseley, 1879
Stellapora Cairns, 1983
Stenohelia Kent, 1870
Stephanohelia Cairns, 1991
Stylantheca Fischer, 1931
Stylaster Gray, 1831
Systemapora Cairns, 1991

References

 
Filifera
Cnidarian families